Craig David Bowden (born June 18, 1968) is an American professional golfer who has played on the PGA Tour and the Web.com Tour. He has two children.

Bowden played college golf at the University of Indianapolis and in 1989 was a member of the Great Lakes Valley Conference Championship team.

Bowden has gone back and forth between the PGA Tour and the Web.com Tour during his career. He was a member of PGA Tour in 1997, 2000–01, 2004, 2007, and 2010 and the Nationwide Tour in 1993, 1996, 1998-1999, 2002, 2003, 2005–06, 2008–09, and 2011–12. He has won three tournaments on the Nationwide Tour and three on the NGA Hooters Tour. At the end of the 2016 season, he ranked 15th on the career Nationwide Tour money list.

Bowden's last full season on the Web.com Tour was 2012. On the 2013 Web.com Tour, he played four events and only made one cut at the Brasil Classic, finishing T52. He has not played on the Web.com Tour since 2013 or the PGA Tour since 2010.

Bowden regularly competes in Indiana Golf Association events, winning the Indiana Open in 1994, 1995, and 2014 and the Indiana PGA Championship in 2015. He finished second in the 2016 Indiana PGA Championship.

Professional wins (11)

Nationwide Tour wins (3)

Nationwide Tour playoff record (1–0)

Other wins (8)
1992 Prestonwood CC (Hooters Tour)
1993 Magnolia Point CC (Hooters Tour)
1994 Indiana Open
1995 Indiana Open, Heritage Links CC (Hooters Tour)
2014 Indiana Open
2015 Indiana PGA Championship
2017 Indiana PGA Championship

Results in major championships

CUT = missed the half-way cut
"T" = tied

See also
1996 PGA Tour Qualifying School graduates
1999 PGA Tour Qualifying School graduates
2003 Nationwide Tour graduates
2006 Nationwide Tour graduates
2009 Nationwide Tour graduates

References

External links

American male golfers
Indianapolis Greyhounds men's golfers
PGA Tour golfers
Korn Ferry Tour graduates
Golfers from Indiana
Bedford North Lawrence High School alumni
People from Bedford, Indiana
1968 births
Living people